Maarten Vandevoordt (born 26 February 2002) is a Belgian professional footballer who plays as a goalkeeper for Belgian First Division A club Genk. He will join Bundesliga club RB Leipzig in 2024.

Club career
On 10 December 2019, Vandevoordt, aged 17 years 287 days, became the youngest goalkeeper in UEFA Champions League history, playing 90 minutes in a 4–0 loss to Napoli.

On 12 April 2022, German club RB Leipzig announced that they had completed a deal to sign Vandevoordt in 2024 on a five-year contract running until 2029.

Career statistics

Notes

Honours
Genk
 Belgian Cup: 2020–21

References

External links

2002 births
Living people
People from Sint-Truiden
Belgian footballers
Association football goalkeepers
Belgium youth international footballers
Belgium under-21 international footballers
Sint-Truidense V.V. players
K.R.C. Genk players
Belgian Pro League players
Footballers from Limburg (Belgium)
21st-century Belgian people